The Office of Naval Research (ONR) is an organization within the United States Department of the Navy responsible for the science and technology programs of the U.S. Navy and Marine Corps. Established by Congress in 1946, its mission is to plan, foster, and encourage scientific research to maintain future naval power and preserve national security.  It carries this out through funding and  collaboration with schools, universities, government laboratories, nonprofit organizations, and for-profit organizations, and overseeing the Naval Research Laboratory, the corporate research laboratory for the Navy and Marine Corps. NRL conducts a broad program of scientific research, technology and advanced development.

ONR Headquarters is in the Ballston neighborhood of Arlington, Virginia.  

ONR Global has offices overseas in Santiago, Sao Paulo, London, Prague, Singapore, and Tokyo.

Overview
ONR was authorized by an Act of Congress, Public Law 588, and subsequently approved by President Harry S. Truman on August 1, 1946. Its stated mission is "planning, fostering, and encouraging scientific research in recognition of its paramount importance as related to the maintenance of future naval power and the preservation of national security."

Today, ONR carries this out through funding with grants and contracts scientists and engineers who perform basic research, technology development, and advanced technology demonstrations

ONR's Science and Technology Portfolio is allocated as follows:
"10% Quick Reaction & Other S&T, 
30% Acquisition Enablers, 
10% Leap Ahead Innovations, 
40% Discovery & Invention (Basic and Applied Science),
10% Other."

Organization
ONR reports to the U.S. Secretary of the Navy through the Assistant Secretary of the Navy for Research, Development and Acquisition. The Chief of Naval Research is Rear Admiral Lorin C. Selby and the Vice Chief of Naval Research is Brigadier General Kyle B Ellison, United States Marine Corps, who also serves as Director of United States Marine Corps Futures Directorate and Commanding General of the United States Marine Corps Warfighting Laboratory.

ONR executes its mission through science and technology departments, corporate programs, the Naval Research Laboratory (NRL), and the ONR Global office.

Science and Technology Departments
ONR has six science and technology departments that support a broad range of subjects, which span such efforts as combating terrorism, oceanography, sea warfare, and life sciences. These fund basic research programs, primarily through U.S. universities; technology research programs, primarily through government and nongovernment laboratories; and advanced technology demonstration programs, primarily through U.S. industry and companies.

Additionally, ONR has an Office of Transition that supports technology transitions to the Navy and Marine Corps; a Small Business Innovative Research Office that encourages small businesses to develop and commercialize products in support of ONR’s mission; a Future Naval Capabilities Program that works to provide technologies to close warfighting gaps; and a Corporate Programs Office that supports cross-disciplinary research and education programs.  As of February, 2020, ONR oversees NavalX, the US Navy Agility Cell founded by James “Hondo” Geurts in 2018.

ONR Corporate Programs:  Research & Education
ONR supports many corporate research and education programs, including:
 Naval Research Enterprise Intern Program (NREIP)
 Multidisciplinary Research Program of the URI (MURI) 
 Defense University Research Instrumentation Program (DURIP) of the URI
 DoD Experimental Program to Stimulate Competitive Research (DEPSCOR)
 Young Investigator Program
 DoD National Defense Science and Engineering Graduate (NDSEG) Fellowship Program of the URI
 Summer Faculty Research Program
 Faculty Sabbatical Leave Program
 Naval High School Science Awards Program
 HBCU (Historically Black Colleges/Universities) Future Engineering Faculty Fellowship Program
HBCU/Minority Institutions Program
 Science and Engineering Apprentice Program (SEAP) (Run by ONR, funded by the American Society for Engineering Education)
Science, Mathematics, And Research For Transformation (SMART) Defense Scholarship Program

Naval Research Laboratory

The Naval Research Laboratory (NRL) was founded in 1923 and today employs over 2,500 scientists and engineers.  NRL is the corporate research laboratory for the Navy and Marine Corps and conducts a broad program of scientific research, technology and advanced development.  It has a prestigious history, including the development of the first U.S. radar system,  synthetic lubricants (for modern gas turbine engines), over-the-horizon radar, the first U.S. surveillance satellite, and the Clementine space mission.  A few of the Laboratory's current specialties include plasma physics, space physics, materials science, and tactical electronic warfare.

ONR Global
ONR Global regional offices are located in:
 RAF Blenheim Crescent, London, U.K. (Europe)
 Santiago, Chile (Latin America)
 Tokyo, Japan (Asia/Pacific)
 Australia (Asia/Pacific)
 Singapore (South Asia/Singapore)
 Prague, Czech Republic (Europe)

ONR Global is a supporter of the Global Security Challenge at the London Business School.

Research

ONR's investments have enabled many firsts, including the launch of the first U.S. intel satellite; the development of SEALAB I/II; the validation of the GPS concept and launch of the first GPS satellite; the first global atmospheric prediction model; GWOT support through various quick response programs; and, most recently, the electromagnetic railgun, the Infantry Immersive Trainer, and super-conducting
motors. Others include:

 Combat Tactical Vehicle (Technology Demonstrator)
 ULTRA AP 
 Shadow RST-V
 Sea Fighter
 Quiet Electric Drive
 R/P FLIP
 CALDIC (California Digital Computer) – from 1951 to 1955
 Biomimetic anti-fouling ship coatings
 Ocean thermal energy conversion(OTEC or OTE)
 Large Vessel Interface Lift-on/Lift-off

The ONR has also sponsored symposia such as the Symposium on Principles of Self-Organization at Allerton Park in 1960.

ONR projects and programs

 BGM-109 Tomahawk
 Infantry Immersion Trainer
 Interactive Scenario Builder (Tactical Environmental Simulation)
 High Frequency Active Auroral Research Program
 HMMWV replacement process
 Massive Multiplayer Online Wargame Leveraging the Internet
 SIMDIS

Alleged
 Philadelphia Experiment: Said to have been conducted in 1943, three years prior to the establishment of ONR.

See also
Related organizations and agencies

 United States Naval Research Laboratory
 Naval Submarine Medical Research Laboratory
 Naval Research Advisory Committee
 United States Army Research Laboratory
 Air Force Research Laboratory
 Fleet Electronic Warfare Center (FEWC)
 National Oceanic and Atmospheric Administration
 University-National Oceanographic Laboratory System
 List of auxiliaries of the United States Navy

References

External links
Office of Naval Research Homepage
 Naval Research Laboratory Homepage

Office of the Secretary of the Navy
Science and technology in Virginia
Military in Virginia
Military units and formations established in 1946
Research in the United States
Arlington County, Virginia
Military research of the United States